Blome Parish is an administrative unit of Smiltene Municipality, Latvia.

References 

Parishes of Latvia
Smiltene Municipality